Katherine Jackson (born 1930) is the matriarch of the Jackson family.

Katherine Jackson may also refer to:
Catherine Jackson (1824–1891), author

See also
Kathy Jackson (born c. 1966), union leader
Kate Jackson (disambiguation)
Cath Jackson, British lesbian cartoonist